The Night Manager is a British television serial directed by Susanne Bier and starring Tom Hiddleston, Hugh Laurie, Olivia Colman, Tom Hollander, David Harewood and Elizabeth Debicki. It is based on the 1993 novel of the same title by John le Carré and adapted to the present day by David Farr. The six-part series began broadcasting on BBC One on 21 February 2016. In the United States, it began on 19 April 2016 on AMC. It has been sold internationally by IMG to over 180 countries.

The Night Manager was nominated for thirty-six awards and won eleven, including two Primetime Emmy Awards (for director Bier and music composer Victor Reyes) and three Golden Globe Awards (for Hiddleston, Colman, and Laurie).

Premise
Jonathan Pine, night manager of a luxury hotel in Cairo and former British soldier, is recruited by Angela Burr, the manager of a Foreign Office task force investigating illegal arms sales, to infiltrate the inner circle of arms dealer Richard Roper.

Cast

Main
 Tom Hiddleston as Jonathan Pine
 Hugh Laurie as Richard "Dicky" Onslow Roper
 Olivia Colman as Angela Burr
 Tom Hollander as Major Lance "Corky" Corkoran
 Elizabeth Debicki as Jemima "Jed" Marshall  
 Alistair Petrie as Alexander "Sandy" Langbourne, the Lord Langbourne
 Natasha Little as Caroline "Caro" Langbourne, the Lady Langbourne
 Douglas Hodge as Rex Mayhew
 David Harewood as Joel Steadman
 Tobias Menzies as Geoffrey Dromgoole
 Antonio de la Torre as Juan Apostol
 Adeel Akhtar as Rob Singhal
 Michael Nardone as Frisky
 Hovik Keuchkerian as Tabby

Supporting
 Noah Jupe as Danny Roper
 David Avery as Freddie Hamid
 Amir El-Masry as Youssuf 
 Aure Atika as Sophie (Samira) Alekan
 Nasser Memarzia as Omar Barghati
 Russell Tovey as Simon Ogilvey
 Neil Morrissey as Harry Palfrey
 Katherine Kelly as Pamela, the Permanent Secretary
 Bijan Daneshmand as Kouyami
 Hannah Steele as Marilyn

Production
In January 2015 it was announced that the series would be co-produced by the BBC, AMC and The Ink Factory. Onsite services were provided by Palma Pictures.

Filming began on 19 March 2015 in Zermatt, Switzerland. Production then moved to London, UK. From 13 to 17 April 2015, location filming took place at Blackpool Mill Cottage, Hartland Abbey, and in and around Hartland, Devon.  On 20 April 2015, production moved to Marrakesh, Morocco. The Es Saadi Resort was used as the  location for the fictional Nefertiti Hotel in Cairo. At the end of May, production moved to Majorca, Spain; principal photography wrapped in Majorca on 3 July 2015. Notable places include Port de Sóller, luxury property La Fortaleza in Port de Pollença and several locations in Palma.

The author John le Carré makes a cameo appearance as an insulted restaurant diner in episode four.

In February 2023, it was reported that the second series was in development with Hiddleston set to return.

Episodes

Broadcast
The first episode of The Night Manager was broadcast on 21 February 2016 on BBC One in the United Kingdom. AMC Spain broadcast the series on 24 February 2016 in Spain. TV3 in New Zealand broadcast the series on 28 February 2016. In the United States, the show premiered on 19 April 2016 on AMC. The serial aired in Australia on BBC First on 20 March 2016. The serial aired in Saudi Arabia on AMC starting on 6 June 2016. In Finland the serial premiered 22 June 2016 on MTV3. In Sweden the serial first aired on 22 August 2016 on TV4, split up into eight episodes not the original release of six episodes. In Germany the serial started airing on 29 August 2016 on ZDF. The series was broadcast on Raidió Teilifís Éireann in Ireland on 29 August 2016. On 24 February 2017, The Night Manager started to air in the Netherlands on public broadcaster NPO 1, being broadcast by AVROTROS. The series was broadcast by BBC Persian from 15 February 2018 in Iran, Afghanistan and Tajikistan.

Critical reception
The series received widespread critical acclaim.

Adam Sisman, le Carré's biographer, wrote in the UK The Daily Telegraph, "It is more than 20 years since the novel was published, and in that time two film companies have tried and failed to adapt it, concluding that it was impossible to compress into two hours. But this six-hour television adaptation is long enough to give the novel its due." He added, "And though Hugh Laurie may seem a surprising choice to play 'the worst man in the world', he dominates the screen as a horribly convincing villain.  Alert viewers may spot a familiar face in the background of one scene, in a restaurant: John le Carré himself makes a cameo, as he did in the films of A Most Wanted Man and Tinker Tailor Soldier Spy. But he is on screen only for an instant: blink and you'll miss him."

Reviewing the first episode for The Guardian, Archie Bland began by noting, "The Night Manager is as sexed up as television drama comes. In Tom Hiddleston and Hugh Laurie it has bona fide international stars; in John le Carré's source novel it has a pedigree of untouchable grandeur. The palette is as sumptuous as one of our hero Jonathan Pine's beautiful hotels". He added, "It's Laurie's vulpine performance that gives The Night Manager its force once the smell of money has worn off. But we barely see him for the first 40 minutes – a delayed gratification trick that's always worked like magic on me, ever since we spent the whole first episode of The West Wing waiting impatiently to meet Josiah Bartlet." Turning to Hiddleston's performance, Bland wrote, "And as the embodiment of the show's atmosphere of paralysed establishment glamour, Hiddleston is the business. When the noble beast beneath that accommodating English exterior begins to make itself known, I find the righteous revenge he's intent on wreaking on Roper compelling."

IGN reviewer Jesse Schedeen gave the serial 8.8 out of 10, saying, "The Night Manager proves that television is the ideal format to bring le Carré's novels to life. This miniseries is tightly paced, suspenseful and boasts strong performances from the likes of Hiddleston, Laurie, Colman and Hollander. With any luck, this series will open the doors for more of le Carré's classic spy tales to make their way to the small screen."

The New Yorker reviewer Emily Nussbaum was unimpressed, calling the miniseries "elegant but ultimately empty", with "overwrought sequences of doomed love", "just an old recipe made with artisanal ingredients". She praised the actors but found the characterisation of Roper "less Dr. No and more Mr. Magoo". However, Brian Tallerico called it a "brilliant adaptation" on RogerEbert.com, with praise for the performances of Hiddleston and Laurie, and for Susanne Bier's direction: "Bier brings a cinematic language to The Night Manager, and a deeper understanding of character than we often get in projects that hinge on espionage. She understands that it’s not about the twists and turns of the spy game but the impact it has on those who are playing it."

Accolades

Notes

References

External links
 The Night Manager at AMC
 
 The Night Manager at the British Film Institute
 

2016 British television series debuts
2016 British television series endings
2010s British drama television series
2010s British television miniseries
Espionage television series
AMC (TV channel) original programming
BBC television dramas
Films directed by Susanne Bier
John le Carré
Primetime Emmy Award-winning television series
Television shows based on British novels
English-language television shows
Television shows set in England
Television shows set in Egypt
Television shows set in Morocco
Television shows set in Spain
Television shows set in Switzerland